Lieutenant General  Daniel Jones (died 20 November 1793) was a British Army officer who became colonel of the 2nd (The Queen's Royal) Regiment of Foot.

Military career
Jones became a lieutenant in the 3rd Foot Guards in 1749. Promoted to major-general in 1777, he fought in the American Revolutionary War. He went on to be colonel of the 2nd (The Queen's Royal) Regiment of Foot on 12 August 1777.

References

Sources

1793 deaths
British Army lieutenant generals